A list of books and essays about Billy Wilder:

Individual films

Sunset Boulevard

Wilder